Audrey Winifred Morakane Ketlhoilwe Mosupyoe, known as Morakane Mosupyoe, is a South African politician serving as the Gauteng Member of the Executive Council (MEC) for Sports, Arts, Culture and Recreation since October 2022. She was the MEC for Economic Development, Agriculture and Environment from October 2019 to December 2020 as well as well as the Gauteng MEC for Social Development from December 2020 until October 2022. Prior to her election to the Gauteng Provincial Legislature in 2019, she served as a Tshwane city councillor. Mosupyoe is a member of the African National Congress.

Political career
Mosupyoe joined the African National Congress in 2002 after having been approached by party members. She was elected to the Tshwane city council in 2006. During her first term, she served as the member of the mayoral committee (MMC) for human settlements until October 2009 when she was appointed the MMC for health and social development. She also served on the ANC's regional executive committee and the regional working committee. She is currently a member of the ANC's provincial executive committee and provincial working committee.

After her re-election in May 2011, she was elected as the first female speaker of the council. She held this position until  the 2016 election, when she left the council. Mosupyoe was elected to the Gauteng Provincial Legislature in May 2019. She was then appointed chairperson of the social development portfolio committee in the legislature.

In July 2019, the National Executive Committee of the ANC resolved that Gauteng premier David Makhura had to sack one of his male MECs in order for his executive council to comply with their ruling after the election that in a province with a male premier, 60% of the executive council members had to be female. On 11 October 2019, Makhura announced that the MEC for Economic Development, Agriculture and Environment, Kgosientso Ramokgopa, had resigned from the provincial government. Consequently, he appointed Mosupyoe to Ramokgopa's post. She was sworn in later that same day.

In an executive council reshuffle in December 2020, she was appointed as MEC for Social Development by Makhura.

On 27 June 2022, Mosupyoe was elected as the provincial treasurer of the ANC in Gauteng. She was appointed as MEC for Sports, Arts, Culture and Recreation by the newly elected premier, Panyaza Lesufi.

Personal life
Mosupyoe grew up in Atteridgeville with her five siblings.

References

External links
Meet Ms Morakane Mosupyoe, the new MEC for the Department of Economic Development, Agriculture and Environment. Ms Mosupyoe – ANC GPL Caucus

Living people
Year of birth missing (living people)
African National Congress politicians
People from Pretoria
Members of the Gauteng Provincial Legislature
21st-century South African women politicians
21st-century South African politicians